This is a list of the crossings of the Sacramento River from its mouth at Suisun Bay upstream to the Ribbon Bridge in Redding.  There are many more bridges north of this point up to Lake Siskiyou, immediately east of the source of the river at the confluence of the South and Middle Forks of the Sacramento River. All locations are in California.

Crossings

See also

References

Sacramento River